The Empire Steam Car was a United States steam car manufactured between about 1925 and 1927.  Built with a three-cylinder compound engine, it was designed by Carl Uebelmesser and built in New York City by the Cruban Machine & Steel Corporation.  Only one car was built, and it was not entirely finished.

See also
Empire (1901 automobile)
Empire (1910 automobile)

References

David Burgess Wise, The New Illustrated Encyclopedia of Automobiles.

Steam cars